The Christian denominations hold many different views. A study showed that Crhistian organizations condemned those who were homosexual.

Suicidal ideation is twice as high among homosexual youth than heterosexuals youth.

The relationship between religion and homosexuality has varied greatly across time and place, within and between different religions and denominations, with regard to different forms of homosexuality and bisexuality. The present-day doctrines of the world's major religions and their denominations differ in their attitudes toward these sexual orientations. Adherence to anti-gay religious beliefs and communities is correlated with the prevalence of emotional distress and suicidality in sexual minority individuals, and is a primary motivation for seeking conversion therapy.

Among the religious denominations which generally reject these orientations, there are many different types of opposition, ranging from quietly discouraging homosexual activity, explicitly forbidding same-sex sexual practices among their adherents and actively opposing social acceptance of homosexuality, supporting criminal sanctions up to capital punishment, and even to condoning extrajudicial killings. Religious fundamentalism often correlates with anti-homosexual bias. Psychological research has connected religiosity with homophobic attitudes and physical antigay hostility, and has traced religious opposition to gay adoption to collectivistic values (loyalty, authority, purity) and low flexibility in existential issues, rather than to high prosocial inclinations for the weak. Attitudes toward homosexuality have been found to be determined not only by personal religious beliefs, but by the interaction of those beliefs with the predominant national religious context—even for people who are less religious or who do not share their local dominant religious context. Many argue that it is homosexual actions which are sinful, rather than same-sex attraction itself. To this end, some discourage labeling individuals according to sexual orientation. Several organizations assert that conversion therapy can help diminish same-sex attraction.

However, some adherents of many religions view homosexuality and bisexuality positively, and some denominations routinely bless same-sex marriages and support LGBT rights, a growing trend as much of the developed world enacts laws supporting LGBT rights.

Historically, some cultures and religions accommodated, institutionalized, or revered same-sex love and sexuality; such mythologies and traditions can be found around the world. The status of homosexuality in Hinduism is ambiguous. Hindu texts contain few specific references to same-sex relations, though some punish it. Ayoni sex, which includes oral and anal sex, was not seen as a serious crime, and could be practiced in some cases. Sikh wedding ceremonies are non-gender specific, and so same-sex marriage is possible within Sikhism.

Regardless of their position on homosexuality, many people of faith look to both sacred texts and tradition for guidance on this issue. However, the authority of various traditions or scriptural passages and the correctness of translations and interpretations are continually disputed.

Specific religious groups

Ancient Mesopotamian religion 

Individuals who went against the traditional gender binary were heavily involved in the cult of Inanna, an ancient Mesopotamian goddess. During Sumerian times, a set of priests known as gala worked in Inanna's temples, where they performed elegies and lamentations. Men who became gala sometimes adopted female names and their songs were composed in the Sumerian eme-sal dialect, which, in literary texts, is normally reserved for the speech of female characters. Some Sumerian proverbs seem to suggest that gala had a reputation for engaging in anal sex with men. During the Akkadian Period, kurgarrū and assinnu were servants of Ishtar who dressed in female clothing and performed war dances in Ishtar's temples. Several Akkadian proverbs seem to suggest that they may have also had homosexual proclivities. Gwendolyn Leick, an anthropologist known for her writings on Mesopotamia, has compared these individuals to the contemporary Indian hijra. In one Akkadian hymn, Ishtar is described as transforming men into women. Some modern pagans include Inanna in their worship.

Abrahamic religions 
The Abrahamic religions of Judaism, Christianity and Islam, have traditionally forbidden sodomy, believing and teaching that such behavior is sinful.  Today some denominations within these religions are accepting of homosexuality and inclusive of homosexual people, such as Reform Judaism, the United Church of Christ and the Metropolitan Community Church. Some Presbyterian and Anglican churches welcome members regardless of same-sex sexual practices, with some provinces allowing for the ordination and inclusion of gay and lesbian clerics, and affirmation of same-sex unions. Reform Judaism incorporates lesbian and gay rabbis and same-sex marriage liturgies, while Reconstructionist Judaism and Conservative Judaism in the US allows for lesbian and gay rabbis and same-sex unions.

Judaism

The Torah (first five books of the Hebrew Bible) is the primary source for Jewish views on homosexuality. (Like many similar commandments, the stated punishment for willful violation is the death penalty, although in practice rabbinic Judaism no longer believes it has the authority to implement death penalties.)

Orthodox Judaism views homosexual acts as sinful. In recent years, there have been approaches claiming that only the sexual anal act is forbidden and considered an abomination by the Torah, while sexual orientation and even other sexual activities are not considered a sin. Conservative Judaism has engaged in an in-depth study of homosexuality since the 1990s, with various rabbis presenting a wide array of responsa (papers with legal arguments) for communal consideration. The official position of the movement is to welcome homosexual Jews into their synagogues, and also campaign against any discrimination in civil law and public society, but also to uphold a ban on anal sex as a religious requirement.

Reform Judaism and Reconstructionist Judaism in North America and Liberal Judaism in the United Kingdom view homosexuality to be acceptable on the same basis as heterosexuality. Progressive Jewish authorities believe either that traditional laws against homosexuality are no longer binding or that they are subject to changes that reflect a new understanding of human sexuality. Some of these authorities rely on modern biblical scholarship suggesting that the prohibition in the Torah was intended to ban coercive or ritualized homosexual sex, such as those practices ascribed to Egyptian and Canaanite fertility cults and temple prostitution.

Christianity

The Hebrew Bible/Old Testament and its traditional interpretations in Judaism and Christianity have historically affirmed and endorsed a patriarchal and heteronormative approach towards human sexuality, favouring exclusively penetrative vaginal intercourse between men and women within the boundaries of marriage over all other forms of human sexual activity, including autoeroticism, masturbation, oral sex, non-penetrative and non-heterosexual sexual intercourse (all of which have been labeled as "sodomy" at various times), believing and teaching that such behaviors are forbidden because they're considered sinful, and further compared to or derived from the behavior of the alleged residents of Sodom and Gomorrah.

Christian denominations hold a variety of views on homosexual activity, ranging from outright condemnation to complete acceptance.  Throughout the majority of Christian history, most Christian theologians and denominations have considered homosexual behavior as immoral or sinful. Most Christian denominations welcome people attracted to the same sex, but teach that homosexual acts are sinful. These denominations include the Roman Catholic Church, the Eastern Orthodox church, the Oriental Orthodox churches, Confessional Lutheran denominations such as the Lutheran Church–Missouri Synod and the Wisconsin Evangelical Lutheran Synod, the United Methodist Church, and some other mainline denominations, such as the Reformed Church in America and the American Baptist Church, as well as Conservative Evangelical organizations and churches, such as the Evangelical Alliance, and fundamentalist groups and churches, such as the Southern Baptist Convention. Pentecostal churches such as the Assemblies of God, as well as Restorationist churches, like Iglesia ni Cristo, the Jehovah's Witnesses and the Church of Jesus Christ of Latter-day Saints, also take the position that homosexual sexual activity is sinful.

Liberal Christians are generally supportive of homosexuals. Some Christian denominations do not view monogamous same sex relationships as bad or evil. These include the United Church of Canada, the United Church of Christ, the Episcopal Church, the Presbyterian Church (U.S.A.), the churches of the Old Catholic Union of Utrecht, the Evangelical Lutheran Church in America, the Evangelical Lutheran Church in Canada, the Church of Sweden, the Lutheran, reformed and united churches in Evangelical Church of Germany, the Church of Denmark, the Icelandic Church, the Church of Norway and the Protestant Church of the Netherlands. In particular, the Metropolitan Community Church, a denomination of 40,000 members, was founded specifically to serve the Christian LGBT community, and is devoted to being open and affirming to LGBT people. The United Church of Christ and the Alliance of Baptists also condone gay marriage, and some parts of the Anglican and Lutheran churches allow for the blessing of gay unions. Within the Anglican communion there are openly gay clergy; for example, Gene Robinson and Mary Glasspool are openly homosexual bishops in the US Episcopal Church and Eva Brunne in Lutheran Church of Sweden. The Episcopal Church's recent actions vis-a-vis homosexuality have brought about increased ethical debate and tension within the Church of England and worldwide Anglican churches. In the United States and many other nations, the religious people are becoming more affirming of same-sex relationships. Even those in denominations with official stances are liberalizing, though not as quickly as those in more affirming religious groups.

Passages from the Mosaic Covenant and its broader Old Testament context have been interpreted to mean that anyone who is engaging in homosexual practices should be punished with death (Leviticus 20:13; cf. Genesis 19:4–25; Judges 19:22–20:48; 2 Peter 2:6–10; Jude 7). HIV/AIDS has also been portrayed by some Christian fundamentalists such as Fred Phelps and Jerry Falwell as a punishment by God against homosexuals. In the 20th century, theologians like Karl Barth, Jürgen Moltmann, Hans Küng, John Robinson, Bishop David Jenkins, Don Cupitt, and Bishop Jack Spong challenged traditional theological positions and understandings of the Bible; following these developments some have suggested that passages have been mistranslated, are taken out of context, or that they do not refer to what is generally understood as "homosexuality."

Conservative denominations generally oppose same-sex sexual relations based on Old Testament and New Testament texts that describe human sexual relations as strictly heterosexual by God's design. As such, it is argued that sexual desires and actions that contradict God's design are deemed sinful and are condemned by God (e.g. Leviticus 18:22; cf. Leviticus 20:13). Since love does not rejoice in unrighteousness or iniquity (cf. 1 Corinthians 13:6), and since homosexual desires and actions are believed to remain contrary to God's design and condemned by God as sinful/iniquity (e.g. in general, Romans 126-27; passively, 1 Corinthians 6:96:9; actively, including but not limited to pederasty, 1 Corinthians 6:9; 1 Timothy 1:9-11; considered sexually immoral, Galatians 5:19-21; Colossians 3:5-7; Ephesians 5:3), adherents of conservative denominations believe that genuine love for God and humanity is best expressed by following God rather than the world (Acts 5:29; cf. Jeremiah 23:1-40; Romans 12:9).

Where the Catholic view is founded on a natural law argument informed by scripture and proposed by Thomas Aquinas, the traditional conservative Protestant view is based on an interpretation of scripture alone. Protestant conservatives also see homosexual relationships as an impediment to heterosexual relationships. They interpret some Biblical passages to be commandments to be heterosexually married.  Catholics, on the other hand, have accommodated unmarried people as priests, monks, nuns and single lay people for over 1,000 years. A number of self-described gay and 'ex-gay' Christians have reported satisfaction in mixed-orientation marriages.

Catholic Church

The Catholic Church teaches that those who are attracted to persons of the same sex are called to practice chastity, just like everyone else has to before they get married. The Catholic Church does not regard homosexual activity as an expression of the marital sacrament, which it teaches is only possible within a lifelong commitment of a marriage between a man and a woman. According to the Church's sexual ethics, homosexual activity falls short in the complementarity (male and female organs complement each other) and fecundity (openness to new life) of the sexual act. Few studies of parishioners' individual views are sometimes at variance with the church's non-acceptance of homosexuality.

Latter-day Saints

All homosexual or same-sex sexual activity is forbidden by the Church of Jesus Christ of Latter-day Saints (LDS Church) in its law of chastity, and the church teaches that God does not approve of same-sex marriage and may punish same-sex sexual behavior with a disciplinary council. Members of the church who experience homosexual attractions, including those who self-identify as gay, lesbian, or bisexual remain in good standing in the church if they abstain from same-sex marriage and all sexual relations outside an opposite-sex marriage, but all, including those participating in same-sex activity and relationships, are allowed to attend weekly church worship services. However, in order to receive church ordinances such as baptism, and to enter church temples, adherents are required to abstain from same-sex relations. Additionally, in the church's plan of salvation noncelibate gay and lesbian individuals will not be allowed in the top tier of heaven to receive exaltation unless they repent, and a heterosexual marriage is a requirement for exaltation.

The LDS Church previously taught that homosexuality was a curable condition and counseled members that they could and should change their attractions and provided therapy and programs with that goal. From 1976 until 1989 the Church Handbook called for church discipline for members attracted to the same sex equating merely being homosexual with the seriousness of acts of adultery and child molestation—even celibate gay people were subject to excommunication. Church publications now state that "individuals do not choose to have such attractions", its church-run therapy services no longer provides sexual orientation change efforts, and the church has no official stance on the causes of homosexuality. These current teachings and policies leave homosexual members with the option of potentially harmful attempts to change their sexual orientation, entering a mixed-orientation opposite-sex marriage, or living a celibate lifestyle without any sexual expression (including masturbation).

Islam

All of the major Islamic schools disapprove of homosexuality. Islam views same-sex desires as an unnatural temptation, and sexual relations are seen as a transgression of the natural role and aim of sexual activity. Islamic teachings (in the hadith tradition) presume same-sex attraction, extol abstention and (in the Qur'an) condemn consummation.

The discourse on homosexuality in Islam is primarily concerned with activities between men. There are, however, a few hadiths that mention homosexual behavior among women. Although punishment for lesbianism is rarely mentioned in the histories, al-Tabari records an example of the casual execution in the year 170 AH (786 or 787 AD) of a pair of lesbian slavegirls in the harem of al-Hadi in a collection of highly critical anecdotes pertaining to that Caliph's actions as ruler.

Bahá'í Faith

Bahá'í law limits permissible sexual relations to those between a man and a woman in marriage. Believers are expected to abstain from sex outside matrimony. Bahá'ís do not, however, attempt to impose their moral standards on those who have not accepted the Revelation of Bahá’u’lláh. The Bahá'í Faith takes no position on the sexual practices of those who are not adherents. While requiring uprightness in all matters of morality, whether sexual or otherwise, the Bahá’í teachings also take account of human frailty and call for tolerance and understanding in regard to human failings. In this context, to regard homosexuals with prejudice would be contrary to the spirit of the Bahá’í teachings. 

Bahá'í Faith does not acknowledge marriage outside of one man and one woman, therefore anyone not practicing heterosexual relationships cannot marry and must always remain celibate.

Indian religions
Among the religions that originated in ancient and medieval India, including Hinduism, Buddhism, Jainism and Sikhism, teachings regarding homosexuality are less clear than among the Abrahamic traditions, and religious authorities voice diverse opinions. In 2005, an authority figure of Sikhism condemned same-sex marriage and the practice of homosexuality. However, many people in Sikhism do not oppose gay marriage. Hinduism is diverse, with no supreme governing body, but the majority of swamis opposed same-sex relationships in a 2004 survey, and a minority supported them. Ancient religious texts such as the Vedas often refer to people of a third gender known as hijra, who are neither female nor male. Some see this third gender as an ancient parallel to lesbian, gay, bisexual, transgender and intersex identities.

Hinduism 

 
Hinduism does not have a central authority. Many Hindu sects have taken various positions on homosexuality, ranging from positive to neutral or antagonistic. Referring to the nature of Samsara, the Rigveda, one of the four canonical sacred texts of Hinduism says 'Vikruti Evam Prakriti' (Perversity/diversity is what nature is all about, or, What seems unnatural is also natural). A "third gender" has been acknowledged within Hinduism since Vedic times. Several Hindu texts, such as Manu Smriti and Sushruta Samhita, assert that some people are born with either mixed male and female natures, or sexually neuter, as a matter of natural biology (while at the same time there are examples of speaking negatively in regards to male homosexuality as shown by the Manu Smrititi and Arthashastra). In addition, each Hindu denomination had developed distinct rules regarding sexuality, as Hinduism is not unified and is decentralized in essence.

Hindu groups are historically not unified regarding the issue of homosexuality, each one having a distinct doctrinal view.

The Indian Kama Sutra, written around 150 BC, contains passages describing eunuchs or "third-sex" males performing oral sex on men. The text describes Kama as one of the three objectives to be achieved in life. Though it forbids the educated Brahmins, bureaucrats and wisemen from practicing Auparishtaka (oral sex).

Similarly, some medieval Hindu temples and artifacts openly depict both male homosexuality and lesbianism within their carvings, such as the temple walls at Khajuraho. Some infer from these images that at least part of the Hindu society and religion were previously more open to variations in human sexuality than they are at present.

Ayoni sex, which includes oral and anal sex, never came to be viewed as much of a sin like in Christianity nor a serious crime and could be practiced in some cases. Close friendship between people of same genders has also been seen as permissible in Hindu texts.

Several Hindu priests have performed same-sex marriages, arguing that love is the result of attachments from previous births and that marriage, as a union of spirit, is transcendental to gender.

Buddhism 

The most common formulation of Buddhist ethics are the Five Precepts and the Eightfold Path, one should neither be attached to nor crave sensual pleasure. The third of the Five Precepts is "To refrain from committing sexual misconduct." However, "sexual misconduct" is a broad term, and is subjected to interpretation relative to the social norms of the followers. 
The determination of whether or not same-gender relations is appropriate for a layperson is not considered a religious matter by many Buddhists.

According to the Pāli Canon and Āgama (the Early Buddhist scriptures), there is not any saying that same or opposite gender relations have anything to do with sexual misconduct, and some Theravada monks express that same-gender relations do not violate the rule to avoid sexual misconduct, which means not having sex with someone under age (thus protected by their parents or guardians), someone betrothed or married or who has taken vows of religious celibacy.

Some later traditions gradually began to add new restrictions on sexual misconduct, like non-vagina sex, though some academics argue it usually involves situations seem as coerced sex. This non-vagina sex as sexual misconduct view is not based on what Buddha's said, but from some later Abhidharma texts.

Buddhism is often characterized as distrustful of sensual enjoyment and sexuality in general.  Traditionally, sex and lust are seen as hindering to spiritual progress in most schools of Buddhism; as such monks are expected to refrain from all sexual activity, and the Vinaya (the first book of the Tripitaka) specifically prohibits sexual intercourse, then further explain that anal, oral, and vaginal intercourse amount to sexual intercourse, which will result in permanent exclusion from Sangha.  A notable exception in the history of Buddhism occurred in Japan during the Edo period, in which male homosexuality, or more specifically, love between young novices and older monks, were celebrated.

References to pandaka, a eunuch/impotence category that is sometimes interpreted to include homosexual males, can be found throughout the Pali canon as well as other Sanskrit scriptures. In the Chinese version of Sarvastivada Vinaya, the pandaka is mentioned as also trying to have sex with women, not just men. Leonard Zwilling refers extensively to Buddhaghosa's Samantapasadika, where pandaka are described as being filled with defiled passions and insatiable lusts, and are dominated by their libido. Some texts of the Abhidharma state that a pandaka cannot achieve enlightenment in their own lifetime, (but must wait for rebirth) and Asanga and Vasubandhu discussed if a pandaka was able to be enlightened or not. According to one scriptural story, Ananda—Buddha's cousin and disciple—was a pandaka in one of his many previous lives.

Some later classic Buddhist masters and texts disallow contact between monks/Bodhisattva and pandakas/women and classify non-vagina sex as sexual misconduct, including for lay followers.

The third of the five precepts of Buddhism states that one is to refrain from sexual misconduct; this precept has sometimes been interpreted to include homosexuality. The Dalai Lama of the Gelug sect of Tibetan Buddhism previously interpreted sexual misconduct to include lesbian and gay sex, and indeed any sex other than penis-vagina intercourse, including oral sex, anal sex, and masturbation or other sexual activity with the hand; the only time sex is acceptable is when it performed for its purpose of procreation. In 2009, when interviewed by Canadian TV news anchor Evan Solomon on CBC News: Sunday about whether or not homosexuality is acceptable in Buddhism, the Dalai Lama responded that "it is sexual misconduct." However, the Dalai Lama supports human rights for all, "regardless of sexual orientation." In the most recent interview on this topic (March 10, 2014), the Dalai Lama said gay marriage is "OK", provided it's not in contradiction with the values of one's chosen religion. Also in an Indian and Tibetan tradition, the Nalandabodhi sangha has stated that they are welcoming of all sexual orientations.

In Thailand, some accounts propose that "homosexuality arises as a karmic consequence of violating Buddhist proscriptions against heterosexual misconduct. These karmic accounts describe homosexuality as a congenital condition which cannot be altered, at least in a homosexual person's current lifetime, and have been linked with calls for compassion and understanding from the non-homosexual populace." However, Buddhist leaders in Thailand have also condemned homosexuality, ousted monks accused of homosexual acts, and banned kathoey from ordination. In 2009, Senior monk Phra Maha Wudhijaya Vajiramedh introduced a "good manners" curriculum for novices in the monkhood, stating to the BBC that he was concerned by "the flamboyant behaviour of gay and transgender monks, who can often be seen wearing revealingly tight robes, carrying pink purses and having effeminately-shaped eyebrows." However, in Thailand, several leaders in the Theravada tradition including Phra Payom Kalayano have expressed support for LGBT rights.

A later popular Japanese legend attributed the introduction of monastic homosexuality to Japan to Shingon founder Kukai, although scholars now dismiss the veracity of this assertion, pointing out his strict adherence to the Vinaya. Nonetheless, the legend served to "affirm same sex relation between men and boys in seventeenth century Japan." However, Japanese Buddhist scholar and author of "Wild Azaleas" Kitamura Kigin argued that there was a tendency in monasteries to avoid heterosexuality and to encourage homosexuality.

Although Mahayana Buddhism has some texts against homosexuality (from later Abhidharma texts and Buddhist apocrypha), the majority of its teachings assert that all beings who correctly practice the dharma may reach enlightenment, since all possess an innate Buddha nature. Enlightenment being achievable even in a single life. Some Mahayana Buddhist leaders were active in the movement for same-sex marriage rights in Taiwan which legalized same-sex marriages in 2019.

Well known Zen Buddhist, Thich Nhat Hanh, notes the spirit of Buddhism is inclusiveness and states "when you look at the ocean, you see different kinds of waves, many sizes and shapes, but all the waves have water as their foundation and substance. If you are born gay or lesbian, your ground of being in the same as mine. We are different, but we share the same ground of being."

The capacity of Buddhism to reform itself and its great variety of distinct beliefs and schools, provide many liberal streams of Buddhism, which are accepting of all sexual orientations. Reformists of Buddhism are mainly predominant in cosmopolitan cities. In global traditions, there is a widescale support for LGBT rights including the European Buddhist Union, the Buddhist Churches of America, many Shin Buddhist groups, and Zen leaders such as Thich Nhat Hanh. The Federation of Australian Buddhist Councils (FABC), representing Buddhist laypeople, and the Australian Sangha Association vocally supported same-sex marriage in Australia. Soka Gakkai International-USA (SGI-USA) is the most diverse Buddhist community in the United States with more than 500 chapters and some 100 centers throughout the country supports LGBT rights. In a PEW research poll, 88% of American Buddhists stated that homosexuality should be accepted. This was a higher level of support than any other religious group studied.

Sikhism 

Sikhism has no written view on the matter, but in 2005, a Sikh religious authority described homosexuality as "against the Sikh religion and the Sikh code of conduct and totally against the laws of nature," and called on Sikhs to support laws against gay marriage. Many Sikhs are against this view, however, and state that the Sikh Scriptures promote equality and do not condemn homosexuality.

In Sikh Scripture

In Guru Granth Sahib, marriage is seen as a union of souls. In Sikhism, the soul is seen as genderless, and the outward appearance of human beings (man, woman) is a temporary state. Same-sex marriage advocates refer to this fact.

Zoroastrianism

The Vendidad, one of the later Zoroastrian texts composed in the Artificial Young Avestan language, has not been dated precisely. It is thought that some concepts of law, uncleanliness, dualism, and salvation were shared between the religions, and subsequent interactions between the religions are documented by events such as the release of the Jews from the Babylonian captivity by Zoroastrian Cyrus the Great in 537 BC, and the Biblical account of the Magi visiting the infant Jesus.

The Vendidad generally promotes procreation: "the man who has a wife is far above him who lives in continence; he who keeps a house is far above him who has none; he who has children is far above the childless man; he who has riches is far above him who has none." It details the penance for a worshipper who submits to sodomy under force as "Eight hundred stripes with the Aspahe-astra, eight hundred stripes with the Sraosho-charana." (equal to the penalty for breaking a contract with the value of an ox), and declares that for those participating voluntarily "For that deed there is nothing that can pay, nothing that can atone, nothing that can cleanse from it; it is a trespass for which there is no atonement, for ever and ever". However, those not practicing the Religion of Mazda were pardoned for past actions upon conversion. It has been argued that, in ancient times, those prohibitions against sodomy didn't apply to eunuchs.

East Asian religions
Among the Taoic religions of East Asia, such as Taoism, passionate homosexual expression is usually discouraged because it is believed to not lead to human fulfillment.

Burmese folk religion 

Many Nat Kadaws in traditional Burmese folk religion are members of the LGBT community.

Chinese folk religion 

Tu'er Shen, also known as the Rabbit God, is a gay Chinese deity. In 2006, Lu Wei-ming founded a temple for Tu'er Shen and Taoist worship in Yonghe District in the New Taipei City in Taiwan. About 9,000 pilgrims visit the temple each year praying for a suitable (same-sex) partner. The Wei-ming temple also performs love ceremonies for gay couples. It is the world's only religious shrine for homosexuals.

Confucianism
Confucianism, being primarily a social and political philosophy, focused little on sexuality; whether homosexual or heterosexual. However, the ideology did emphasize male friendships, and Louis Crompton has argued that the "closeness of the master-disciple bond it fostered may have subtly facilitated homosexuality". Homosexuality is not mentioned in the Analects of Confucius.

Đạo Mẫu 

In Vietnam, many LGBT people find a safe community within the Đạo Mẫu religion which is worship on the mother god. Many LGBT people act as mediums during Đạo Mẫu rituals.

Shinto 

Historically, Shinto "had no special code of morals and seems to have regarded sex as a natural phenomenon to be enjoyed with few inhibitions." While Shinto beliefs are diverse, Japanese Shinto doesn't condemn homosexuality, and the formally organized Konkokyo sect is fully affirming. Multiple Shinto leaders advocated in support of gay marriage in Hawaii.

Taoism

There is no single official position on homosexuality in Taoism, as the term Taoism is used to describe a number of disparate religious traditions encompassing a variety of views. Although Taoist alchemy generally emphasized that ejaculation in heterosexual relationships represented a draining of the male's "life essence," this concept was not generally extended to non-heterosexual sex. 

In a similar way to Buddhism, Taoist schools sought throughout history to define what would be sexual misconduct. Broadly speaking, the precept against "sexual misconduct" in Taoism relates to extramarital sex. The term for a married couple (夫婦) usually in Chinese suggests a male with a female, though Taoist scripture itself does not explicitly say anything against same-sex relations. Many sorts of precepts mentioned in the Yunji Qiqian, The Mini Daoist Canon, does not explicitly say anything against same-gender relations as well.

Homosexuality is not unknown in Taoist history, such as during the Tang dynasty when Taoist nuns exchanged love poems. As a sexual misconduct however would depend on what sect or school they were from as some traditions considered homosexuality to be misconduct and others did not mention it at all. There are also certain talismans recorded in different traditions that claim to "cure" a person of the "homosexual disease/desire". Attitudes about homosexuality within Taoism often reflect the values and sexual norms of broader Chinese society and what region of China the sect resided in (see Homosexuality in China).

African Diasporic religions

Candomblé
Within Candomblé, a syncretic religion founds primarily found in Brazil, there is widespread (though not universal) support for gay rights, many members are LGBT, and have performed gay marriages. In Candomblé, homosexuality is usually accepted and explained by the sex of one's orisha. Homosexuality would be more probable in a man with a female orisha, a woman with a male orisha, or any of them with an androgynous orisha (such as Olokun).

Haitain Vodou 

Main article: Haitian Vodou and sexual orientationHomosexuality is religiously acceptable in Haitian Vodou. The lwa or loa (spirits) Erzulie Dantor and Erzulie Freda are often associated with and viewed as protectors of queer people. The lao Ghede Nibo is sometimes depicted as an effeminate drag queen and inspires those he inhabits to lascivious sexuality of all kinds.

Santería 
Practitioners of Santería, primarily found in Cuba,  generally (though not universally) welcome LGBT members and include them in religious or ritual activities.

Umbanda 
Also a Brazilian syncretic religion, Umbanda houses generally support LGBT rights and have performed gay marriages.

New religious movements

Antoinism 
Antoinism, a new religious movement founded in Belgium in 1910, does not provide any prescription on issues such as sexuality, as it considers that this is not related to spirituality; homosexuality is not deemed a sin and there is nothing wrong to be gay and antoinist.

Eckankar 
Eckankar, an American new religious movement founded by Paul Twitchell in 1965, says on its website that "where legally recognized, same-sex marriages are performed, in the form of the ECK Wedding Ceremony, by ordained ministers of Eckankar".

Neo-Druidism 
The Order of Bards, Ovates and Druids is a worldwide group dedicated to practicing, teaching, and developing modern Druidry and has more than 25,000 members in 50 countries. The Order is LGBT-affirming within a larger framework of support for civil rights, love of justice, and the love of all existences.

Raëlism 

Raëlism, an international new religious movement and UFO religion which was founded in France in 1974, promotes a positive outlook towards human sexuality, including homosexuality. Its founder Raël recognised same-sex marriage, and a Raëlian press release stated that sexual orientation is genetic and it also likened discrimination against gay people to racism. Some Raëlian leaders have performed licensed same-sex marriages.

Santa Muerte 
The cult of Santa Muerte is a new religious movement centered on the worship of Santa Muerte, a cult image, female deity, and folk saint which is popularly revered in Mexican Neopaganism and folk Catholicism. A personification of death, she is associated with healing, protection, and safe delivery to the afterlife by her devotees. Santa Muerte is also revered and seen as a saint and protector of the lesbian, gay, bisexual, transgender, and queer (LGBTQ+) communities in Mexico, since LGBTQ+ people are considered and treated as outcasts by the Catholic Church, evangelical churches, and Mexican society at large. Many LGBTQ+ people ask her for protection from violence, hatred, disease, and to help them in their search for love. Her intercession is commonly invoked in same-sex marriage ceremonies performed in Mexico. The Iglesia Católica Tradicional México-Estados Unidos, also known as the Church of Santa Muerte, recognizes gay marriage and performs religious wedding ceremonies for homosexual couples. According to R. Andrew Chesnut, Ph.D. in Latin American history and professor of Religious studies, the cult of Santa Muerte is the single fastest-growing new religious movement in the Americas.

Pre-colonial religions of the Americas 

Among the Indigenous peoples of the Americas prior to the European colonization, many Nations had respected ceremonial, religious, and social roles for homosexual, bisexual, and gender-nonconforming individuals in their communities and in many contemporary Native American and First Nations communities, these roles still exist. Homosexual and gender-variant individuals were also common among other pre-conquest civilizations in Latin America, such as the Aztecs, Mayans, Quechuas, Moches, Zapotecs, and the Tupinambá of Brazil and were accepted in their various religions.

It is important to note that the indigenous peoples of the Americas includes hundreds of cultures with varying views on sex, gender, and spirituality. Additionally, first nations and indigenous views on gender and sexuality may not fall within modern western categorizations of sex and gender.

Pre-colonial religions of the Philippines 

Filipino shamans, often known as babaylan held positions of authority as religious leaders or healers in some precolonial Philippine societies. Cross-dressing or non-gender conforming males sometimes took on the role of the female babaylan. Early historical accounts record the existence of male babaylans who wore female clothes and took the demeanor of a woman. Anatomy was not the only basis for gender. Being male or female was based primarily on occupation, appearance, actions and sexuality. A male babaylan could partake in romantic and sexual relations with other men without being judged by society. A small number of Filipinos practice local indigenous religions today.

Paganism

Radical Faeries
The Radical Faeries are a worldwide queer spiritual movement, founded in 1979 in the United States.

Wicca
The Wiccan Charge of the Goddess, one of the most famous texts in Neopaganism, states in the words of the Goddess, "all acts of love and pleasure are my rituals". In traditional forms of Wicca, such as Gardnerian and Alexandrian Wicca, magic is often performed between a man and a woman, and the "Great Rite" is a sex ritual performed between a Priest and Priestess representing the God and Goddess; however, this is not generally seen as excluding homosexuals or magic between same-sex couples. Most groups still insist, however, that initiations be conferred from man to woman or woman to man.

Satanism
Both major Satanic traditions, The Satanic Temple and the Church of Satan, emphasise the right of the individual to free sexual expression. Lucien Greaves, spokesperson of The Satanic Temple, has stated the Temple "will always fight… to the death to ensure that there are equal rights for the gay community."

Unitarian Universalism

The first ordained minister of a major religious sect in the U.S. or Canada to come out as gay was the UU Minister James Stoll in 1969. There have been denominational resolutions supporting LGBTQ people since 1970, when a resolution was passed that condemned discrimination against homosexuals. Unitarian Universalism was the first denomination to accept openly transgender people as full members with eligibility to become clergy; in 1988 the first openly transgender person was ordained by the Unitarian Universalist Association (UUA).

The UUA has supported the marriage equality since 1996 and compared those who resisted such equality to the resistance to the abolition of slavery, women's suffrage, and the end of anti-miscegenation laws. Three-quarters of all UU congregations have undertaken a series of organizational, procedural, and practical steps to become acknowledged as a "Welcoming Congregation": a congregation that is intentionally welcoming and inclusive of LGBTQ members. On June 29, 1984, the UUA became the first major denomination "to approve religious blessings on homosexual unions." Unitarian Universalists were in the forefront of the work to make same-sex marriages legal in their local states and provinces, as well as on the national level. In May 2004, Arlington Street Church, Boston, was the site of the first state-sanctioned same-sex marriage in the United States. LGBTQ people are regularly ordained as ministers, and have also served at the highest levels of leadership in the denomination, including as president of the Canadian Unitarian Council, interim co-president of the Unitarian Universalist Association, and co-moderator of the UUA.

Humanism
Humanism is a non-religious, non-theistic approach to life that supports full equality for LGBTQ individuals, including the right to marry. Humanism and Its Aspirations, a statement of humanist principles from the American Humanist Association, states that "humanists are concerned for the well being of all, are committed to diversity, and respect those of differing yet humane views...work to uphold the equal enjoyment of human rights and civil liberties in an open, secular society and maintain it is a civic duty to participate in the democratic process and a planetary duty to protect nature's integrity, diversity, and beauty in a secure, sustainable manner." The American Humanist Association provides an LGBT Humanist Pride award and has funded an LGBT-inclusive prom for Itawamba County Agricultural High School in Mississippi. The organisation LGBT Humanists UK  "is a United Kingdom-based not-for-profit that campaigns for lesbian, gay, bisexual and transgender (LGBT) equality and human rights and promotes Humanism as an ethical worldview." It was formerly an independent group, but since 2012 has been a part of the charity Humanists UK. In 2009 they gave Stephen Fry an award "for his services to humanism and gay rights."

Humanists UK Chief Executive Andrew Copson, who is gay, once wrote that "humanists have always been champions of LGBT rights" and cited his organisation's many years campaigning for decriminalisation and LGBT equality in the UK, including legal same-sex marriages. He pointed out the large number of LGBT people in the movement, including Stephen Fry, Christian Jessen, and Peter Tatchell, as well as historical associations with humanism like the writer Virginia Woolf and E M Forster. In a statement following the Orlando nightclub shooting for the International Humanist and Ethical Union, of which Copson is also President, he went further, saying "Humanism is the ultimate, long-standing and unfaltering ally of LGBTI people everywhere".

Unification Church
Unification Church views heterosexual marriage which becomes "fruitful" by raising their children as God's ideal. Any other sexual relationship, than between husband and wife, is considered a sin. 
Unification Church founder Sun Myung Moon opposed homosexuality and free sex and in some of his speeches compared such relationships to "dirty dung filled water" and that "Satan and dirty dung-eating dogs go after that". He prophesied that "gays will be eliminated" in a "purge on God's orders".

Religious groups and public policy

Opposition to same-sex marriage and LGBT rights is often associated with conservative religious views. The American Family Association and other religious groups have promoted boycotts of corporations whose policies support the LGBT community.

In conservative Islamic nations, laws generally prohibit same-sex sexual behaviour, and interpretation of Sharia Law on male homosexuality carries the death penalty. This has been condemned as a violation of human rights by human rights organisation Amnesty International and by the writers of the Yogyakarta principles. With the signature of the US in 2009, the proposed UN declaration on LGBT rights has now been signed by every European secular state and all western nations, as well as other countries—67 members of the UN in total. An opposing statement put forward by Muslim nations was signed by 57 member states, mostly in Africa and Asia. 68 out of the total 192 countries have not yet signed either statement. In 2011 the United Nations Human Rights Council passed a landmark resolution initiated by South Africa supporting LGBT rights (See Sexual Orientation and Gender Identity at the United Nations)

See also

 Culture war
 LGBT rights by country or territory
 Religion and sexuality
 Religious trauma syndrome
 The Bible and homosexuality

References

Notes

Citations

Sources

 John Boswell, [[Christianity, Social Tolerance, and Homosexuality|Christianity, Social Tolerance, and Homosexuality: Gay People in Western Europe from the Beginning of the Christian Era to the Fourteenth Century]], University Of Chicago Press, 1st ed. 1980 , paperback November 2005 
 Claussen, D. S. 2002. Sex, Religion, Media. Rowman & Littlefield.
Etengoff, C. & Daiute, C., (2015). Clinicians’ perspectives of religious families’ and gay men’s negotiation of sexual orientation disclosure and prejudice, Journal of Homosexuality, 62(3), 394-426. 
Etengoff, C. & Daiute, C. (2014). Family Members’ Uses of Religion in Post–Coming-Out Conflicts With Their Gay Relative. Psychology of Religion and Spirituality. 6(1), 33-43. 
 Hurteau, P. (2013). Male Homosexualities and World Religions, Palgrave. .
 Johnson, P. and Vanderbeck, R.M. (2014) Law, Religion and Homosexuality, Abingdon: Routledge. 
 Mathew Kuefler (editor), The Boswell Thesis : Essays on Christianity, Social Tolerance, and Homosexuality, University Of Chicago Press, November 2005 
 Macnutt, Francis (2006) "Can Homosexuality Be Healed?" publisher 'Chosen Books', 
 Stephen O. Murray and Will Roscoe (eds.), "Islamic Homosexualities: culture, history, and literature" NYU Press New York 1997
 
 Arlene Swidler: Homosexuality and World Religions.'' Valley Forge 1993. 
 
 Wafer, Jim (1991) "The Taste of Blood: Spirit Possession in Brazilian Candomblé" UPP Philadelphia
 Wafer, Jim (1997) "Muhammad and Male Homosexuality" in "Islamic Homosexualities: culture, history, and literature" by Stephen O. Murray and Will Roscoe (eds.), NYU Press New York
 Wafer, Jim (1997) "The Symbolism of Male Love in Islamic Mysthical Literature" in "Islamic Homosexualities: culture, history, and literature" by Stephen O. Murray and Will Roscoe (eds.), NYU Press New York 1997

Sexual ethics
Homosexuality